Ornaments from the Silver Arcade is the third full-length album by Young Knives, released in the United Kingdom on 4 April 2011 on the Gadzook label.

The track "Love My Name" was released as a single on 14 March 2011.

Track listing
 "Love My Name" – 3:14
 "Woman" – 3:47
 "Everything Falls Into Place" – 3:05
 "Human Again" – 3:41
 "Running from a Standing Start" – 3:11
 "Sister Frideswide" – 3:58
 "Vision in Rags" – 3:29
 "Go to Ground" – 3:59
 "Silver Tongue" – 3:39
 "Storm Clouds" – 2:33
 "Glasshouse" – 4:50

iTunes bonus track
 "Her Pearls" - 3:08

References

2011 albums
Young Knives albums
Albums produced by Nick Launay